The following is a list of the films with the most cinema admissions in France, as of 7 March 2023.

Background colour  indicates films currently in cinemas

The website for the above table lists La Grande Illusion (1937) with an estimated 12.5 million admissions but the actual admissions are unknown.

French productions
The following are the 100 French films with the most admissions in France as of 31 July 2020.

Background colour  indicates films currently in cinemas

See also 

 Lists of highest-grossing films

References 

French film-related lists
France